The Temnić inscription (  Temnićki natpis) is one of the oldest records of medieval Serbian redaction of the Old Church Slavonic Cyrillic script from the territory of modern Serbia, dated to the late 10th, or early 11th century, when this territory was part of the First Bulgarian Empire. It contains the form of accusative singular noun God (бога instead of богь), characteristic of Serbian edit of Old Slavonic language. The limestone plate was discovered in the vicinity of a school in the village of Gornji Katun, near Varvarin, in the region of Temnić in Pomoravlje. It was acquired by the National Museum of Serbia in 1909. The tablet represents a scientific conundrum as no other remains of an edifice were found and paleographic and linguistic analysis of the text reveals little information.

Description

See also
Medieval Serbian inscriptions

References

Sources
 
 

11th-century inscriptions
Old Serbian inscriptions
11th century in Serbia
Medieval Christian inscriptions
Rasina District
Collections of the National Museum of Serbia
Old Church Slavonic language
Medieval Serbian texts
Cyrillo-Methodian studies